Anacrusis yanayacana is a species of moth of the family Tortricidae. It is found in Napo Province, Ecuador.

The wingspan is about 28 mm. The ground colour of the forewings is brownish cream, sprinkled and suffused with cinnamon brown and strigulated (finely streaked) brown. The costal area is dark brown to the middle and then paler and cinnamon in the distal third. The hindwings are brownish, in the distal half mixed with cream ferruginous.

Etymology
The species name refers to the name of the research station Yanayacu where the species was first found.

References

Moths described in 2010
Atteriini
Moths of South America
Taxa named by Józef Razowski